Deadeye Dick was an American alternative rock trio that was formed in New Orleans, Louisiana.

History of the band
The band, which consisted of vocalist/guitarist Caleb Guillotte, bassist Mark Adam Miller, and drummer Billy Landry, was formed in 1991 and took their name from the Kurt Vonnegut novel of the same name.  The group built up a loyal following touring the Southeast.  They self-produced their first album even though they still had not landed a record deal.  A song titled "New Age Girl" from this self-published record became popular regionally and earned airplay in New Orleans and Atlanta.  After receiving this airplay, the band landed a record deal with the independent label Ichiban Records.  Ichiban released the group's debut album A Different Story in 1994.  After its release, the song "New Age Girl" was selected for inclusion on the Dumb and Dumber feature film soundtrack. The publicity from the film caused the song to become a national hit, peaking at No. 27 on the Billboard Hot 100 in March 1995. The band released their second album, Whirl, in 1995 but were unable to reproduce the success produced by "New Age Girl". Deadeye Dick later disbanded.  Caleb Guillotte and Mark Miller continue to remain active in the local New Orleans music scene as producers.

Caleb Guillotte
Caleb Guillotte (born March 13, 1963) is the band's former singer, lead guitarist and principal songwriter. After a 20-plus year career as a professional musician, he currently works primarily in the New Orleans film industry in Art and Set Decoration.

Guillotte continues to perform locally, writing for, co-writing and playing with other artists such as former bandmate Mark Adam (aka Mark Miller), Susan Cowsill, Vicki Peterson of the Bangles, Paul Sanchez (formerly of Cowboy Mouth), and others.

Discography

References

External links
[ Allmusic entry for Deadeye Dick]

Alternative rock groups from Louisiana
Musical groups established in 1991
Musical groups disestablished in 1996
Musical groups from New Orleans